Akagawa (written: 赤川 lit. "red river") is a Japanese surname. Notable people with the surname include:

, Japanese writer
, Japanese baseball player
Kinji Akagawa (born 1940), American sculptor
, Japanese samurai

See also
Akagawa Station, (赤川駅 Akagawa-eki), a railway station in Mutsu, Aomori Prefecture, Japan
Aka River, (赤川 Akagawa), a river in Yamagata Prefecture, Japan

Japanese-language surnames